Mahendra Patel is an electrical engineer at the Electric Power Research Institute in Palo Alto, California. He was named a Fellow of the Institute of Electrical and Electronics Engineers (IEEE) in 2016 for his contributions to synchrophasors standardization.

In 2010 he was awarded the Gutenberg Prize of the International Gutenberg Society and the City of Mainz.

References

Fellow Members of the IEEE
Living people
Year of birth missing (living people)
Place of birth missing (living people)
American electrical engineers